Jardim-Pomar (Garden-Orchard) is the eighth studio album by Brazilian singer-songwriter Nando Reis and his band Os Infernais. It was recorded in São Paulo, São Paulo, Brazil and in Seattle, Washington, United States, with the help of producers Barrett Martin and Jack Endino. Its lyrics deal with themes such as death, faith, absence of God and passions.

Production and recording 
Jardim-Pomar took one year to be prepared due to the fact that Reis had full control over everything, forcing him to work according to his financial situation. For him, "this time of maturation was very good for the music, because it could develop to places which otherwise it wouldn't". He also defined it as his "most complete and complex, most toilsome album, but it came out exactly like I wanted it". Released in November 2016, it was ready since April.

It was produced by Jack Endino (who had already produced his previous album, Sei, and some albums by Titãs, Reis' former band) and Barrett Martin, with whom he collaborated in the past. Commenting on their work, Reis said they "are friends and work together, but have totally different methods when producing an album. This brought a unique personality to each song, in spite of them being in a group inside the album, something I always seek".

For Reis, "the work is always a frame of the moment we live in. I prepared it in no hurry, in one year, and it is optimistic and excited, even with some lyrics dealing with sober themes." About the lyrical themes, he commented:

Song information 
Reis refers to the single "Só Posso Dizer" as "one of those songs that appear to emerge ready as soon as the first verse and melody show up, almost as in a dream. Jack Endino (producer) told me it looks like a song from another time". It is featured in two versions: one recorded in Seattle and a slower one recorded in São Paulo nine months later. Reis compares it to the song "Isn't It a Pity", by George Harrison, released under two different versions in All Things Must Pass (1970). The song was composed after his wife, Vânia, 2,5 years before the album release. "It is a beautiful song, somehow sad, but it is also a revision of a long love story which is never linear [...] it is about this love that resists detrition, about knowing what one wants, despite everything. The chorus summarizes it well and cites a verse by Lupicínio: 'Não consigo dormir sem seus braços' [I can't sleep without your arms]. It's shards and sections of a relationship which compose a beautiful mosaic." About the song and its versions, he also said:

"Inimitável" talks about tolerance for differences and was written based on Reis's childhood with a deaf brother and a sister with cerebral palsy; both conditions resulting from their meningitis. "4 de Março" is another song dedicated to Vânia, which whom he was for over 30 years by the time of the album release. The date which names the song (4 March) refers to an important event to the couple, but Reis did not want to give any detail. "Concórdia" is the only previously released song, composed in the 90s and released in 2003 by Elza Soares in her album Vivo Feliz.

"Azul de Presunto" features, among other artists, the singers Branco Mello, Sérgio Britto, Arnaldo Antunes and Paulo Miklos, his former colleagues in Titãs, despite Antunes not being a member since the early 90s and Miklos having left the band between the recording sessions and the album release. About the song, the first studio recording featuring all of them since Tudo ao Mesmo Tempo Agora (1991) by Titãs, Reis said: "We realized we did not gather in studio for 25 years and it couldn't be any different because the song has a Titãs thing. This song has much to do with our humor, it is provocative and awkward. In another interview, in which he commented the guest performances of other singers, he said:

"Como Somos" is another collaboration of Reis with Skank's Samuel Rosa. Originally, it would be used in the band's 2014 album Velocia, but it was ultimately left aside, despite having been recorded as a demo. About its story, Reis says:

Release 
The album was released in digital, CD, cassette and vinil forms – in the latter case, due to its total length, it was divided in two parts: Jardim and Pomar.

Reception

Critical reception 

Writing for O Globo, Leonardo Lichote says: "Reis conduces the listener through his 'Garden-orchard' as if he walked through the tragic-redemptive trajectory of existence – the thematic spine of the album. [...] In the 13 tracks, among Neil Young's grammar, lessons of tradition of the Brazilian music, sounds of steps and writing machines, Reis finds his own demons, more pacified than ever. And gods, be it by christian symbology or by love treated as a divinity – tracing in 'Jardim- pomar' a particular Eden."

Mauro Ferreira, at G1, said "Jardim – Pomar is an album commanded by division, already perceivable in its title" and concluded that "a result of mature reflections on themes such as love, life, death and God, Nando Reis harvest in Jardim – Pomar is big."

Accolades 
The album won the 2017 Latin Grammy Award for Best Portuguese Language Rock or Alternative Album and the song "Só Posso Dizer" was nominated for Best Portuguese Language Song in the same award.

Track listing

Personnel 
Credits according to multiple sources.
 Nando Reis – vocals and acoustic guitar
 Alex Veley – keyboards
 Diogo Gameiro – drums
 Felipe Cambraia – bass
 Jack Endino – production, guitar in "Infinito Oito", "Deus Meu" and "Inimitável"
 Theo Reis e Sebastião Reis – backing vocals in "infinito Oito" and "Azul de Presunto"
 Arnaldo Antunes, Branco Mello, Sérgio Britto, Paulo Miklos, Luiza Possi, Pitty, Tulipa Ruiz and Zoe Reis – backing vocals in "Azul de Presunto"
 Peter Buck (ex-R.E.M.) – guitar
 Mike McCready (Pearl Jam) – guitar
 Jimmy James – guitar in "Infinito Oito"
 Walter Villaça – guitar in "Infinito Oito" and "Lobo Preso em Renda"
 Fassbinder String Quartet – strings in "Concórdia" and "Água Viva"
 Vânia Mignone – art and cover
 Chris Hanzsek (Hanzsek Audio) - mastering

References 

2016 albums
Nando Reis albums
Portuguese-language albums
Self-released albums
Albums produced by Jack Endino
Latin Grammy Award for Best Portuguese Language Rock or Alternative Album